Kozlovice is a municipality and village in Frýdek-Místek District in the Moravian-Silesian Region of the Czech Republic. It has about 3,100 inhabitants.

Administrative parts
The village of Měrkovice is an administrative part of Kozlovice.

History
The first written mention of Kozlovice is from 1294. The village of Měrkovice was founded in 1789.

References

External links

Villages in Frýdek-Místek District